Píndaro de Carvalho Rodrigues (1 June 1892 – 30 August 1965) was a Brazilian footballer and manager. He was also part of Brazil's squad for the 1919 South American Championship.

References

1892 births
1965 deaths
Footballers from São Paulo
Brazilian footballers
Brazilian football managers
Brazil international footballers
Fluminense FC players
CR Flamengo footballers
Brazil national football team managers
1930 FIFA World Cup managers
Association football defenders